Edward Boyle may refer to:

 Sir Edward Boyle, 1st Baronet (1848–1909), MP for Taunton 1906–1909, grandfather of Baron Boyle
 Edward Boyle, Baron Boyle of Handsworth (1923–1981), British Conservative Party politician, MP 1950–1970
 Edward C. Boyle (died 1981), Allegheny County District Attorney for Pittsburgh from 1956 to 1964
 Edward Courtney Boyle (1883–1967), English Royal Navy officer, First World War recipient of the Victoria Cross
 Edward F. Boyle, (1876–1943) Borough president of Manhattan, New York in 1919
 Edward G. Boyle (1899–1977), Canadian set decorator
 Edward James Boyle Sr. (1913–2002), U.S. federal judge
 Edward Mayfield Boyle (1874–1936), Sierra Leone Creole medical doctor
 Eddie Boyle (1874–1941), American baseball catcher

See also
Boyle (disambiguation)